Nate Wood (born October 3, 1979) is an American jazz multi-instrumentalist. He has performed with Wayne Krantz, Kneebody, Tigran Hamasyan, Louis Cole, The Calling, and Taylor Hawkins and the Coattail Riders.

Background

Nate learned to play drums, bass, guitar, and saxophone, and attended the California Institute of the Arts for bass and drums, studying with Charlie Haden and Joe LaBarbera. He also attended LAMA College for Music Professionals for drums, where he studied under Ralph Humphrey and Joe Porcaro. After graduating, he played with Kneebody on their first gigs, and then toured with The Calling in support of their debut album. Afterwards, he recorded and played every instrument on his debut album, and in addition to his work with Kneebody, toured and performed with artists such as George Harrison, Chaka Khan, Sting, Wayne Krantz, Donny McCaslin, Taylor Hawkins and the Coattail Riders, and the Ed Fry Band.

Discography

As a leader
 Reliving (2003)
 Fall (2007)
 Another Time (2014)
 fOUR (2018)
'With Kneebody
 Wendel (2002)
 Kneebody (2005)
 Low Electrical Worker (2007)
 Kneebody Live: Volume One' (2007)
 Twelve Songs By Charles Ives (2009) 
 Kneebody Live: Volume Two:  Live in Italy (2009)
 You Can Have Your Moment (2010)
 Kneebody Live: Volume Three:  Live in Paris (2011)
 The Line (2013)
 Kneedelus (2015) 
 Anti-Hero (2017)
 By Fire (2019)
 Chapters (2019)
With ACT - Ben Wendel, Harish Raghavan, & Nate Wood
 ACT (2009)
 ACT II (2015)

As a sideman
With Wayne Krantz
 Good Piranha / Bad Piranha (2014)

With Tigran Hamasyan
 Red Hail (2009)
 Shadow Theater (2012)

With Taylor Hawkins and the Coattail Riders
 Taylor Hawkins and the Coattail Riders (2006)
 Red Light Fever (2010)

With The Calling
 Camino Palmero (2001)

References

External links 
 Official Site
 2015 Audio Interview with Nate Wood from the I'd Hit That Podcast

Living people
1979 births
Place of birth missing (living people)
California Institute of the Arts alumni
American jazz drummers
Taylor Hawkins and the Coattail Riders members
21st-century American drummers
Kneebody members